Bibby Island (variously named on maps as Bibyos, Sir Bibby, Sir Bibby's, Sir Bybie's, and Sir Bibye's) was named for Sir Bibby Lake, governor from 1712 to 1743. 
It is one of several uninhabited Canadian arctic islands in the Kivalliq Region, Nunavut, Canada. It is located within western Hudson Bay,  from the community of Whale Cove.

Other islands in the vicinity include Airartuuq Island, Flattop Island, Imiligaarjuk Island, Imilijjuaq Island, Irik Island, Ivuniraarjuq Island, Kayak Island, and Walrus Island.

Geography
The large, low island is characterized by till and boulders, separated from Neville Bay's shore by a narrow, shallow channel.

References
 For Sir Bibby Lake see 

Uninhabited islands of Kivalliq Region
Islands of Hudson Bay